Karosa B 832 is an urban bus produced by bus manufacturer Karosa from the Czech Republic, in the years 1997 to 1999. It was succeeded by Karosa B 932 in 1996.

Construction features 
Karosa B 832 is a model of the Karosa 800 series. The B 832 is very similar to its predecessor, the Karosa B 732 city bus, and also unified with city bus model B 841 and with intercity bus C 834. The body is semi-self-supporting with frame and engine with manual gearbox in the rear part. The engine drives only the rear axle. The front axle is independent, rear axle is solid. All axles are mounted on Air suspension. On the right side are three doors (first are narrower than middle doors). Inside are used leatherette seats, plastic Vogelsitze or Fainsa seats. The driver's cab is separated from the rest of the vehicle by a glazed partition. In the middle, or in the rear part is room for a pram or wheelchair.

Production and operation 
Because in the states of former Soviet Union were problems with the connivance of the new Karosa 900 series, Karosa decided to continue for these countries with production of modified buses 700 series under new designation – 800 series (it was in the 80s once used). 800 series buses were manufactured since 1997, when was completed production of the 700 series, until 1999, when it was finally replaced by buses of 900th series. B 832 buses produced a total of 102 pieces.
B 832 were intended primarily for export to the countries of the former Soviet Union. A few pieces ended in Czech Republic and Slovakia due to insolvency of buyers. Some vehicles B 832, operated in the former Czechoslovakia, were also purchased as a "replacement" body for the older buses 700th series.

Historical vehicles 
 MHDT Kladno (Karosa B832.1654, ex COMETT PLUS)

See also 

 List of buses

References 

Buses manufactured by Karosa
Buses of the Czech Republic